Yousif Massas (born 9 April 1979) is a Syrian boxer. He competed in the men's light middleweight event at the 2000 Summer Olympics.

References

1979 births
Living people
Syrian male boxers
Olympic boxers of Syria
Boxers at the 2000 Summer Olympics
Place of birth missing (living people)
Boxers at the 1998 Asian Games
Asian Games competitors for Syria
Light-middleweight boxers
20th-century Syrian people